Jorge Alberto Urias Gaxiola (born 23 April 1992) is a Mexican footballer who plays as a second striker.

References

External links 
 
 
 
 
 

Living people
1992 births
Association football forwards
Club América footballers
Footballers from Sinaloa
Mexican footballers